Gafr and Parmon District is a district (bakhsh) in Bashagard County, Hormozgan Province, Iran. At the 2006 census, its population was 7,968, in 1,933 families.  The District has no cities.  The District has one rural district (dehestan): Gafr and Parmon Rural District.

References 

Districts of Hormozgan Province
Bashagard County